Hulaginakoppa is a village in Dharwad district of Karnataka, India.

Demographics 
As of the 2011 Census of India there were 94 households in Hulaginakoppa and a total population of 435 consisting of 222 males and 213 females. There were 67 children ages 0-6.

References

Villages in Dharwad district